Olivier Chevallier (6 February 1949 - 6 April 1980) was a French professional Grand Prix motorcycle road racer.

Born in Vendôme, Loir-et-Cher, Chevallier's best year was in 1977 when he finished in sixth place in the 350cc world championship. His only Grand Prix victory came at the 1976 350cc Yugoslavian Grand Prix at Opatija. He was killed while competing at the Grand Prix of Le Castellet in 1980. Chevallier raced motorcycles designed and built by his brother Alain Chevallier, using Yamaha engines.

References

External links 
 Image of Chevallier at the 1976 Belgian Grand Prix

1949 births
1980 deaths
People from Vendôme
French motorcycle racers
250cc World Championship riders
350cc World Championship riders
500cc World Championship riders
Motorcycle racers who died while racing
Sport deaths in France
Sportspeople from Loir-et-Cher